The Municipality of Radeče is a municipality in central Slovenia. Its seat is the town of Radeče. The area is part of the traditional region of Lower Carniola. It is now included in the Lower Sava Statistical Region. Radeče became a municipality in 1994.

Settlements
In addition to the municipal seat of Radeče, the municipality also includes the following settlements:

 Brunk
 Brunška Gora
 Čimerno
 Dobrava
 Goreljce
 Hotemež
 Jagnjenica
 Jelovo
 Log pri Vrhovem
 Loška Gora
 Močilno
 Njivice
 Obrežje
 Počakovo
 Prapretno
 Rudna Vas
 Stari Dvor
 Svibno
 Vrhovo
 Zagrad
 Zavrate
 Žebnik

References

External links

 Municipality of Radeče on Geopedia
 Municipality of Radeče website

Radeče
1994 establishments in Slovenia